Top Authority Uncut (The New Yea) is the third studio album by American hip hop group Top Authority from Flint, Michigan. It was released on October 21, 1997 through Top Flight Records and Wrap Records with distribution by Ichiban Records. Recording sessions took place at Silver Sun Recording Studio and Pierrenandos in Flint, Michigan, and at Sandcastle in Gary, Indiana. It featured guest appearances from Big Whup, Tuck, Yusef Boswell and Madame Dane. The album peaked at #192 on the Billboard 200 albums chart and at #21 on the Top R&B/Hip-Hop Albums chart in the United States. It spawned two singles: "Playaz"/"Dope Game" and "World War III" (the latter peaked at #37 on the Billboard Hot Rap Songs chart). AllMusic gave the album 4.5 of 5 stars.

Track listing

Personnel 
 Top Authority – vocals, executive producers
 Yusef Boswell – vocals (track 3)
 Madame Dane – vocals (track 4)
 Tuck – vocals (track 6)
 Big Whupp – vocals (track 10)
 Gee Pierce – producer (tracks: 1, 2, 4, 6), co-producer (track 7)
 "Skeet" Jones – producer (track 3)
 Pierre Copeland – producer (track 5), co-producer (track 3), recording (tracks: 3, 5)
 Lavel Jackson – producer (tracks: 7, 8)
 Paxton Miller – producer (track 9)
 Rodney "Villain" Jones – producer (tracks: 10-12)
 Reggie Mayes – producer (track 12)
 Michael Jerome Powell – mixing (tracks: 1-11)
 Bernard Terry – mixing (track 12), engineering
 Bob Ware – recording (track 3)
 Johné Battle – executive producer, art direction, design
 Atty Tom Lewis – executive producer
 Shonda Jessie – coordinator
 Pen & Pixel – art direction, artwork, design, photography

Chart history

References

External links 
 
 Top Authority: Uncut (The New Year) by Top Authority on iTunes

1997 albums
Top Authority albums
Ichiban Records albums